Finn Murphy (born May 22, 1958) is an American long haul trucker and author of The Long Haul: A Trucker's Tales of Life on the Road, published by W.W. Norton & Company. He was born in Greenwich, Connecticut the fifth child of illustrator and cartoonist John Cullen Murphy and Joan Byrne Murphy’s eight children.

He attended parochial schools in Connecticut and attended Colby College in Waterville, Maine. He earned his Commercial Truck Driver license in 1980 and spent almost a decade driving for North American Van Lines. In 2008, Murphy went back on the road as a driver and those two periods became the basis for his book.

In the years between, he lived on Nantucket Island, Massachusetts and worked as a businessman and community activist. Murphy served in several public service positions on Nantucket notably as Chairman of the Nantucket Board of Selectmen, Police Commissioner, and as Airport Commissioner. As a businessman he and his wife Pamela owned and operated several luxury retail enterprises and represented the cashmere manufacturer Johnstons of Elgin from an office in New York’s garment center.

Married 1986-2011 to Pamela (Bembridge) Murphy. No children

Brother to Cullen Murphy, Cullene Murphy, Siobhan Grogan, Byrne Sleeper, Brendan Murphy, Cait Murphy, Mairead Nash.

Works
The Long Haul: A Trucker's Tales of Life on the Road W. W. Norton & Company; June 2017 (hardback), 
The Long Haul: A Trucker's Tales of Life on the Road W. W. Norton & Company; June 2018 (paperback)

References

External links
 Finn Murphy website
 Finn Murphy on NPR's Fresh Air with Terry Gross: https://www.npr.org/2018/02/14/585719252/long-haul-trucker-was-completely-seduced-by-the-open-road
 https://www.forbes.com/sites/nextavenue/2017/08/08/becoming-a-truck-driver-for-your-second-career/#5370196030e5
 http://www.wnyc.org/people/finn-murphy/
 https://vimeo.com/213247554

Living people
American male writers
American truck drivers
1958 births